The International Piano Competition for Outstanding Amateurs (French: Concours des Grands Amateurs de Piano) is a piano competition for amateur pianists, held in Paris, France. It has been held annually since 1989. The competition is widely considered to be one of the top-level competitions for amateur musicians in the world.

Concept 

Created in 1989 by Gérard Bekerman, professor of economics at the university and a graduate of the Paris School of Music, the International Piano Competition for Outstanding Amateurs is designed for top-level amateurs. They come from all walks of life – doctors, office workers, lawyers, students, pensioners, engineers, and many others. The contestant's minimum age is 18; there is no upper age limit.

The competition has met with considerable success over the years, attracting hundreds of candidates from more than 50 countries worldwide. One of the basic principles of the competition is the free choice of programme. There are no set pieces. The aim is not to limit the candidates, but to discover the works of musicians of their own choosing. Gérard Bekerman, the founder of the competition, claims that in Paris, the desire to "win" is outweighed by the love of music: "Pianists discover that the Competition for Outstanding Amateurs is not a competition but an 'anti-competition'. There are no opponents, no competitors, no judges, just music lovers".

The competition is held in three rounds:

 Preliminaries: candidate’s choice (10 minutes)
 Semi-finals: a work by Bach and a romantic composition (15 minutes)
 Finals: free program (30 minutes)

Ten to twelve semi-finalists and five or six finalists are selected each year.

Level 

The originality of the competition lies in the fact that the competitors are not amateurs in the sense of "dabblers", but pianists, "who don’t just play the piano", musicians who, at some time in their lives, have had to make a choice, often a difficult one, between their profession and their potential career as a concert performer, the choice between making a living and their love of music.

As a result, the quality of the performance is very high. Many of the amateurs are real virtuosi; pianists often choose technically tough pieces by Liszt, Chopin or Rachmaninoff for their repertoire.

The winners have been invited to play with orchestral backing in the Sorbonne in Paris, under the baton of Georges Prêtre and the American conductor George Pehlivanian and, more recently, with the Symphony Orchestra of the Republican Guard of Paris directed by François Boulanger and the orchestra of the Paris Conservatorium of Music conducted by Pierre-Michel Durand. Many award winners have been invited to play at the Les Amateurs Virtuoses! festival, one of the most significant festivals for amateur pianists held all over the world.

Jury 

Each year, the panel of judges consists of well-known pianists and key personalities: İdil Biret, Geneviève Joy-Dutilleux, Anne Queffelec, Sabine Lacoarret, Germaine Devèze, François-René Dûchable, Marc Laforet, Aldo Ciccolini, Michel Dalberto, Jay Gottlieb, Alexis Weissenberg, Marc-Olivier Dupin, Éric Heidsieck, Jean-Claude Pennetier, Dominique Merlet, Siheng Song, Michel Beroff, Nella Rubinstein and so on.

A second "press panel" consists of more than twenty music critics representing both the main European dailies and the national and international media.

Finally, there is an "audience award" which is given to the amateur pianist who has the most votes from the audience, collected at the final round of the competition.

Prize winners

External links 
 Official International Piano Competition for Outstanding Amateurs website
 25ème Concours des Grands Amateurs de piano - Parlons Piano
 Mikhail Dubov (Press award 2014) in the final round of the 25th competition
 Interview with Ricker Choi, award winner at the 23rd competition

See also 

 International Chopin Piano Competition for Amateurs
 Piano Bridges International Competition for Amateur Pianists

References 

Piano competitions